Agony is a 2018 dark fantasy survival horror video game developed by Polish developer Madmind Studio and published by PlayWay. Players begin their journey as a tormented soul within the depths of Hell without any memories about his past. The special ability to control people on their path, and  possess weak-minded demons, gives players the necessary measures to survive in the extreme conditions they are in. The game received generally unfavorable reviews.

Gameplay
The game is played from a first-person perspective. The player controls one of the Martyrs condemned to Hell, Amraphel (aka Nimrod) tasked with meeting the Red Goddess, one of the creators of Hell, in an effort to escape and return to the land of the living. Unlike other Martyrs, the player possesses the unique ability to possess both other Martyrs and, later in the game, lesser and higher demons, giving them access to special abilities. Using mechanics such as crouching and holding their breath, the player can avoid demons. Besides hiding, the player needs to solve puzzles in order to unlock new areas. There are available hidden statues that the player can collect, as well as paintings which are possible to discover.

Plot

The story follows a lost soul trapped in Hell without any memory of his former life. From what is revealed of the protagonist's backstory, he was a king of an ancient land who made a Faustian bargain with the Red Goddess. In-story, he is referred to as both Nimrod by the Goddess and Amraphel by other condemned souls, some of whom still have their memories, blaming the protagonist for them being damned to Hell because of the acts he committed while alive. As the protagonist wanders through the wastelands of Hell, he discovers a possibility of escaping through the aid of the Red Goddess. Determined, he travels to the Red Goddess' lair to learn how he can be set free.

If the player obeys the Red Goddess's commands, they will ultimately venture to the lowest depths of Hell, provoking a creature known only as the Beast. Sufficiently wearing down the Beast, the protagonist is able to possess it, using its power to break the seals binding it to the lower depths. Satisfied, the Red Goddess reveals herself as the Whore of Babylon and vows to use the Beast to begin the Apocalypse. The protagonist is returned to the living world, per his deal, only to be killed by the Beast moments later as the Red Goddess begins her conquest of Earth, leaving the player's soul to return to Hell.

The story features multiple other endings, dependent on how the player progresses and the choices they make. However, only two of these are canonical.

Development, fundraising and controversy
In November 2016, the developers of Agony started a Kickstarter campaign to fund the creation of the game. The Kickstarter campaign surpassed its goal and ended in December 2016. The game was originally scheduled for a release on March 30, 2018, but was delayed to May 29, 2018.

The game originally had received an "Adults Only" rating from the ESRB due to its level of violence. This led to the developers toning down some of the violence to allow the game to receive a "Mature" rating instead and allowed it to be rated by The ESRB.

A planned "Adults Only" unrated patch for PC was later dropped due to "legal issues". However, on June 6, 2018, the developers said they were "talking with Steam representatives" about offering Agony Unrated as "a separate title produced and published by Madmind Studio and without the involvement of any publishers." For those who already own the original game, this version is either free DLC or a separate purchase at 99% off, which currently is the highest possible discount on Steam's platform. Agony Unrated, the uncensored version of the game, was released on Steam on October 31, 2018. The unrated edition also contains various quality of life improvements such as updated graphics and character models, new gameplay mechanics and enemies, and new endings.

On September 5, 2018, Madmind Studio announced a partnership with Forever Entertainment to bring Agony to Nintendo Switch. It was released on October 31, 2019.

On November 6, 2020, Ignibit announced their partnership with Agony developer MadMind Studio to bring the game to VR.

Reception

Agony was met with "generally unfavorable reviews", according to Metacritic. The Escapists Ben "Yahtzee" Croshaw in his Zero Punctuation review referred to it as "liquidized offal." He specifically criticized the game's overuse of gore, stating: "... environments are simultaneously too busy and extremely boring; turn things up to eleven and stay there, and it's just as dull as staying at one", as well as the unforgiving stealth mechanics. He later ranked it as the second worst game of 2018.

Spin-off games
A spin-off game titled Succubus was announced by Madmind in December 2018. It centers on playing a succubus, Vydija, as she seeks revenge and a task set by Nimrod: gather Baphomet's tongue. In July 2020, a free demo was made available. A Switch port was announced to be in development by Console Labs.

Another spin-off game titled Agony: Lords of Hell was officially announced in December 2021. The game will be set between the events of Agony and Succubus and expands upon the fate of the protagonist of the former game and Vydija who is the protagonist of the latter.

References

External links

2018 video games
Dark fantasy video games
Censored video games
2010s horror video games
Kickstarter-funded video games
Nintendo Switch games
Obscenity controversies in video games
PlayStation 4 games
Single-player video games
Stealth video games
Survival video games
Unreal Engine games
 Indie video games
Video games developed in Poland
Video games featuring female protagonists
Video games about demons
Video games about the afterlife
Video games with alternate endings
Video games set in hell
Windows games
Xbox One games
PlayWay games
Forever Entertainment games